Mohammad Khalili (born October 1, 1993) is an Iranian footballer who plays for Sanat Naft in the Persian Gulf Pro League.

References 

Living people
1993 births
Iranian footballers
Esteghlal F.C. players
Sanat Mes Kerman F.C. players
Khooshe Talaei players
Association football defenders